The Spanish Silver Train was an improvised trail used to transport silver from Potosí, Peru across the isthmus of Panama in order to ship it to Spain via the Spanish treasure fleet.  The silver was usually unloaded in Panama City, then put in mule trains and taken first to Nombre de Dios, and then, following the demise of that city in the late sixteenth century, to Portobello.  The Silver Train was a prime target for English, Dutch and French privateers in the sixteenth and seventeenth century.  Francis Drake and Guillaume Le Testu, a French privateer, succeeded in capturing the train.

References

Spanish colonization of the Americas